The 2016 P&G U.S. National Gymnastics Championships was the 53rd edition of the U.S. National Gymnastics Championships and was held June 3–5, 2016, at the XL Center in Hartford, Connecticut, for senior men and June 23–26, 2016, at the Chaifetz Arena in Saint Louis, Missouri, for women and junior men.

Medal summary

References 

U.S. National Gymnastics Championships
Gymnastics in Missouri
Sports competitions in Hartford, Connecticut
Sports competitions in St. Louis
U.S. Open
U.S. Open
U.S. Open
U.S. Open
2010s in St. Louis